USCGC Charles Moulthrope (WPC-1141) is the United States Coast Guard's 41st  cutter, and the first of six to be homeported in Manama, Bahrain.

Like her sister ships she was built in the Bollinger Shipyards, in Lockport, Louisiana.

Design

Like her sister ships, Charles Moulthrope is designed to perform search and rescue missions, port security, and the interception of smugglers.  She is armed with a remotely-controlled, gyro-stabilized 25 mm autocannon, four crew served M2 Browning machine guns, and light arms. She is equipped with a stern launching ramp, that allows her to launch or retrieve a water-jet propelled high-speed auxiliary boat, without first coming to a stop.  Her high-speed boat has over-the-horizon capability, and is useful for inspecting other vessels, and deploying boarding parties.

The crew's drinking water needs are met through a desalination unit.  The crew mess is equipped with a television with satellite reception.

Operational career

The vessel was delivered to the Coast Guard base in Key West for her acceptance trials on October 22, 2020. She was commissioned in Portsmouth, Virginia on January 21, 2021.

The ships arrived at Naval Station Rota in Spain on April 14, 2021 after their Atlantic crossing. Charles Moulthrope and her sister ship Robert Goldman reached their homeport of Manama, Bahrain on May 25, 2021.

Namesake

In 2010, Charles "Skip" W. Bowen, who was then the United States Coast Guard's most senior non-commissioned officer, proposed that all 58 cutters in the Sentinel class should be named after enlisted sailors in the Coast Guard, or one of its precursor services, who were recognized for their heroism.  The Coast Guard chose Charles Moulthrope as the namesake of the 41st cutter.  Moulthorpe was serving on the Revenue Service cutter USRC Commodore Perry, exploring Alaska, in 1896, when he died after a fall to its deck. Not long before, he had saved four of his shipmates after their small boat capsized while unsuccessfully trying to rescue a fifth shipmate.

References

Sentinel-class cutters

Ships of the United States Coast Guard
Ships built in Lockport, Louisiana
2020 ships